Scott Cinemas Ltd. (also WTW Scott Cinemas Ltd.) are a British cinema chain based in the English county of Devon.

In 2017 WTW Cinemas took a shareholding in Scott Cinemas, and in 2019 became its majority shareholders. The combined companies operate 11 locations (7 branded as Scott; 4 WTW).

Locations
They operate cinemas across the south and southwest of England. The company previously operated a cinema in Lyme Regis, but this closed due to a fire.

The Central Cinema in Barnstaple was named the RAAM Independent UK Cinema of the Year in 2008, and in the same year the Savoy Cinema in Exmouth received an Award of Excellence in the same category.

Future Locations

References

External links
Scott Cinemas

Cinema chains in the United Kingdom
Companies based in Devon